Gitte Hanspal is a Danish model who won the Miss Scandinavia 2005 contest.

Early life
Hanspal completed her master's degree in Business Innovation & Management in 2007 from Copenhagen Business School.

Beauty pageant career
Hanspal was the winner of the Miss Scandinavia 2005 contest and also a contestant in the Miss Universe 2005 contest.

References

External links

Living people
1982 births
People from Aarhus
Danish beauty pageant winners
Danish female models
Danish Hindus
Danish people of Indian descent
Miss Universe 2005 contestants